Martins Chike Amaewhule is a state-level politician in Nigeria, and the incumbent Majority Leader of the Rivers State House of Assembly. He is representing the assembly constituency of Obio-Akpor I. He is a member of the Rivers State People's Democratic Party. He was first elected in 2011, and in a March 2016 election rerun was reelected to the Assembly.

References

Living people
Rivers State Peoples Democratic Party politicians
Members of the Rivers State House of Assembly
People from Obio-Akpor
Year of birth missing (living people)